Hanuš Johann Peter Paul Schwaiger (1854–1912) was a Czech painter, designer, graphic artist and professor, best known for his fairy-tale illustrations.

Biography 

He was the only son of six children born to a German-speaking ironmonger, but was baptized as a Catholic. In 1865, he was enrolled at the local gymnasium, but failed his courses and transferred to the Realschule in Budweis, where he met a teacher who encouraged his artistic interests. In 1873, despite this, he followed his father's wishes and entered the Vienna Business School. He soon ignored his studies and spent more time at the local art schools, prompting his parents to bring him home to work in the family business. He was not deterred, however, and devoted his time to painting when his father was absent.

Going against his family, he returned to Vienna in 1874 and audited classes at the Academy of Fine Arts. After further clashes with his father, he finally prevailed and was given the money to enroll. Carl Wurzinger and Josef Matyáš Trenkwald were among his instructors there. Some of his first works were purchased by Professor Hans Makart, but later attempts to be financially independent failed and he returned, penniless, to his hometown in 1881. Eventually, he found work as an illustrator and was able to visit the Netherlands in 1888, where he became interested in Dutch architecture and softened his painting style.

The following year, Joža Uprka invited him to visit Moravian Slovakia. During his stay there, in Hroznová Lhota, he  married a local schoolteacher. He had to leave, in 1891, apparently because he was being pursued by creditors and, on his wife's suggestion, moved to Bystřice pod Hostýnem where they lived in a forester's house, courtesy of Baron von Loudon. In 1896, they were able to travel to Belgium, the Netherlands and Italy, where he received a commission to copy the frescoes at the Monastery of the Madonna of Lourdes in Verona.

Teaching career
In 1899, he accepted a teaching position at the newly opened Brno University of Technology, but was not pleased, as the work involved simple technical drawing, rather than art. To make matters worse, his creditors tracked him down again and he was able to avert legal action only by receiving financial assistance from the poet, Josef Svatopluk Machar. Shortly after, he was awarded a commission by the Thonet brothers. He painted six watercolors, depicting life in their factory, which were exhibited at the Exposition Universelle (1900). He also created some popular tapestry designs for the Moravská gobelínová manufaktura.

Two years later, he returned to Prague and was named a Professor at the Academy of Fine Arts. His students there included Otakar Kubín, Václav Rabas, Oldřich Blažíček,  and František Mořic Nágl.

In 1906, he developed a tumor on his tongue. He underwent a successful surgery in the Netherlands but, after a few years, the tumor returned. After several more surgeries, it was decided to remove his tongue entirely, and he died of complications not long after.

His home in Prague, the "Villa Tara", was declared a national landmark in 1921 and currently serves as a hotel.

Selected works

References

Further reading 

 Jiří Vykoukal (ed.) Hanuš Schwaiger. 1854–1912 (exhibition catalog), Státni Galerie, Cheb 1999, .
 Miroslav Lamač: Hanuš Schwaiger (Czech History, vol.24) Státni nakladatelstvi krásné literatury, 1957
 Hanuš Schwaiger. Výbor Z Jeho Díla (anthology of his works), with an introduction by  Miloš Jiránek. Výtvarné zjevy. (Art monographs, Vol.2) 1908

External links 

ArtNet: More works by Schwaiger
Brief biography with sketches @ Galerie výtvarného umĕni v Ostravě. 
"The Cave of Steenfoll" by Hauff @ ReadOnline

1854 births
1912 deaths
Czech illustrators
Czech designers
People from Jindřichův Hradec
Academy of Fine Arts Vienna alumni
Deaths from oral cancer
19th-century Czech painters
Czech male painters
20th-century Czech painters
19th-century Czech male artists
20th-century Czech male artists